Marcel Mathis (born December 24, 1991) is a former World Cup alpine ski racer from Austria. Born in Hohenems, Vorarlberg, he primarily competed on the European Cup circuit, but raced in several World Cup events, all in giant slalom.
 
Mathis' first top result in World Cup was his third place in giant slalom in Bansko, Bulgaria, on February 18, 2012. He was in 26th place after the first run, but had the fastest second run to attain the podium. It was also his first top twenty finish at the World Cup level. He finished seventh the following week in Crans-Montana for his second top ten in as many weeks. A third success of this season came three weeks later in Schladming, where he attained the podium again with an excellent second run.

World Cup podiums
2 podium - (2 GS)

Video
YouTube.com - Marcel Mathis stuns with first WC podium - from Universal Sports - 2012-02-18

References

External links
 
 Marcel Mathis World Cup standings at the International Ski Federation
 
 Marcel Mathis.at personal site 
 Marcel Mathis at Austrian Ski team (ÖSV) 
 Marcel Mathis at Head Skis

Austrian male alpine skiers
1991 births
Living people
People from Hohenems
Sportspeople from Vorarlberg